A neocorate was a rank or dignity granted by the Roman Senate and the Emperor under the Empire to certain cities which had built temples to the Emperor or had established cults of members of the Imperial family. The city itself was referred to as neokoros (pl. neokoroi).  A temple dedicated to the emperor was also called neocorate. Starting in the 2nd century CE, the title appeared on many coins.

The term was first used as a title for a city for Ephesus and its Temple of the Sebastoi. There were approximately 37 cities holding the neocorate, concentrated in  the province of Asia, but also in neighboring provinces.

Etymology
A neokoros (νεώκoρος or νεωκόρος) was a sort of warden or sacristan of a temple, probably derived from νεώς 'temple' + κορέω 'to sweep', thus literally a temple-sweeper.

Notes

Bibliography
 Barbara Burrell, Neokoroi: Greek Cities and Roman Emperors, Brill, 2004, .

External links
 "Neocorate",  Coins celebrating the Neocorate, Coinarchives.com

Roman towns types